Joachim Erlend Olufsen (born 14 July 1995) is a Norwegian footballer from Mo i Rana who plays for Stjørdals-Blink.

He started his career in IL Stålkameratene. When he was 16 years old he was recruited to the first team who played in 3. Division. in his first season he delivered most assist, won Rana Blad's player of the year and was named the best player of the season by his teammates. This resulted in a professional contract. When he was 18 years old he joined Rosenborg BK's youth system as the first "last year junior" ever to be signed. Not breaking through in the first team, Mini Jakobsen signed him to Strindheim. He then alternated between Strindheim IL and Mo. Strindheim IL was struggling to keep their place in the division and he came back to Trondheim to play the last half of the season for them. Strindheim IL did not manage to keep their place and was moved down to 4. Division. He instead joined Trondheim-based Eliteserie club Ranheim in 2018, were he played 7 matches in Norway's highest division the first season before getting injured.

Career statistics

Club

References

1995 births
Living people
People from Rana, Norway
Norwegian footballers
Eliteserien players
Strindheim IL players
Ranheim Fotball players
IL Stjørdals-Blink players
Association football forwards
Sportspeople from Nordland